Anavinemina is a genus of moths in the family Geometridae described by Frederick H. Rindge in 1964.

Species
Anavinemina acomos Rindge, 1990
Anavinemina aequilibera Prout, 1933
Anavinemina axica Druce, 1892
Anavinemina axicata Rindge, 1964
Anavinemina brachiata Rindge, 1990
Anavinemina evexa Rindge, 1990
Anavinemina indistincta Warren, 1906
Anavinemina lunaris Rindge, 1990
Anavinemina molybra Rindge, 1964
Anavinemina muraena Druce, 1892
Anavinemina orphna Rindge, 1964
Anavinemina promuraena Rindge, 1964
Anavinemina rindgei Beutelspacher-Baigts, 1981
Anavinemina semicircula Rindge, 1990
Anavinemina striola Rindge, 1990
Anavinemina wellingi Rindge, 1990

References

Ennominae
Geometridae genera